General elections were held in Malawi on 26 and 27 June 1992.  the Malawi Congress Party was the sole legal party at the time, the country having become a one-party state in 1966. Voter turnout was reported to be 80% by the government, but was actually around 40%. 62 incumbents lost their seats.

Campaign
The number of seats in the National Assembly was increased to 141, with President-for-life Hastings Banda able to appoint as many additional members as he saw fit to "enhance the representative character of the Assembly, or to represent particular minority or other special interests in the Republic."

In total, 275 candidates contested the 141 seats, although in 45 there was only a single MCP candidate, who was elected unopposed.

Results

Aftermath
In 1993 a referendum on returning to multi-party democracy was held. Following a victory for the "yes" vote, the MCP ceased to be the sole legal party.

References

General
Elections in Malawi
One-party elections
Malawi
Malawi
Election and referendum articles with incomplete results